Stephen Hampson (born 14 August 1961) is a former rugby union and professional rugby league footballer who played as a  in the 1970s, 1980s and 1990s, and coached rugby league in the 1990s, 2000s and 2010s.
 
He played club level rugby union (RU) for Vulcan RUFC (1978–83) in Newton-le-Willows, and representative level rugby league (RL) for Great Britain, and at club level for Wigan, Illawarra Steelers, Halifax, Salford Reds and the Widnes Vikings.

Playing career

Club career
Hampson played at fullback for defending champions Wigan in their 1987 World Club Challenge victory against the visiting Manly-Warringah Sea Eagles. He also played in their 1991 World Club Challenge victory against the visiting Penrith Panthers. He spent almost ten years as a player for the club between 1983 and 1993. During his Wigan career, he made 296 starts (plus 8 subs bench appearances), scoring 55 tries, 48 conversions and 3 drop goals, a total of 319 points. Wigan reached the Challenge Cup Final eight times while Hampson was at the club, but he missed the first three Challenge Cup Finals (in 1984, 1985 and 1988) due to injury.

Hampson played as an interchange/substitute, i.e. number 14, (replacing  Gary Henley-Smith) in Wigan's 34-8 victory over Warrington in the 1985 Lancashire Cup Final during the 1985–86 season at Knowsley Road, St. Helens, on Sunday 13 October 1985, played  in the 28-16 victory over Warrington in the 1987 Lancashire Cup Final during the 1987–88 season at Knowsley Road, St. Helens, on Sunday 11 October 1987, played  in the 22-17 victory over Salford in the 1988 Lancashire Cup Final during the 1988–89 season at Knowsley Road, St. Helens on Sunday 23 October 1988, and played  (replaced by interchange/substitute Neil Cowie) in the 5-4 victory over St. Helens in the 1992 Lancashire Cup Final during the 1992–93 season at Knowsley Road, St. Helens on Sunday 18 October 1992.

Hampson played  in Wigan's 11-8 victory over Hull Kingston Rovers in the 1985–86 John Player Special Trophy Final during the 1985–86 season at Elland Road, Leeds on Saturday 11 January 1986, played  in the 18-4 victory over Warrington in the 1986–87 John Player Special Trophy Final during the 1986–87 season at Burnden Park, Bolton on Saturday 10 January 1987, played  in the 12-6 victory over Widnes in the 1988–89 John Player Special Trophy Final during the 1988–89 season at Burnden Park, Bolton on Saturday 7 January 1989, and played , and scored a drop goal in the 15-8 victory over Bradford Northern in the 1992–93 Regal Trophy Final during the 1992–93 season at Elland Road, Leeds on Saturday 23 January 1993.

In 1989, he played alongside fellow import Andy Gregory for the Illawarra Steelers in the NSWRL premiership. Although the club finished bottom of the league table, they reached the final of the 1989 Panasonic Cup. Hampson played and scored a try in the final, but the match ended in a 20–22 defeat against Brisbane Broncos.

After being released by Wigan in 1993, he went to play for Halifax, Salford Reds and Widnes Vikings.

Representative career
Hampson was selected to go on the 1988 Great Britain Lions tour, but was forced to withdraw after breaking his arm a few weeks before the tour departed. He was also selected for the 1992 Great Britain Lions tour of Australia and New Zealand. He was capped 12 times for Great Britain between 1987 and 1992.

Coaching career
Hampson was coach of Lancashire Lynx between 1999 and 2000.

He has worked as a fitness conditioner for Sale Sharks, Lancashire CCC, and in rugby league at international level with Great Britain.

As part of the 2010 Wigan Warriors coaching staff re-structure Hampson became the Assistant Under 18's Coach.

References

External links
!Great Britain Statistics at englandrl.co.uk (statistics currently missing due to not having appeared for both Great Britain, and England)
Statistics at wigan.rlfans.com
(archived by web.archive.org) Profile at wigan-warriors.com
(archived by web.archive.org) When Britain defeated the Aussies

1961 births
Living people
Blackpool Panthers coaches
Chorley Lynx coaches
English rugby league coaches
English rugby league players
English rugby union players
Great Britain national rugby league team players
Halifax R.L.F.C. players
Illawarra Steelers players
Place of birth missing (living people)
Rugby league fullbacks
Salford Red Devils players
Widnes Vikings players
Wigan Warriors players